Nashchyokino is a rural locality (a selo) and the administrative center of Nashchyokinskoye Rural Settlement, Anninsky District, Voronezh Oblast, Russia. The population was 529 as of 2010. There are 7 streets.

Geography 
Nashchyokino is located 30 km southwest of Anna (the district's administrative centre) by road. Studyonnoye is the nearest rural locality.

References 

Rural localities in Anninsky District